is a Japanese comedy rock band. It was started by actors  in a theatrical company called "Otona Keikaku" (Project Adult) in 1995. Its original members were Hakai (Sadao Abe), Boudou (Kankuro Kudo), and Baito Kun (Seminosuke Murasugi). When it started, the group was just a group of comedians using the guitar. The members perform in many theaters, and also at Shōten. In 1997, bass, guitar, and drum players join and became a band. In 2002 they released their debut album called  while they were signed to an indie label, "MIDI". In 2005, Group Tamashi signed to Ki/oon Records. The name of the band derives from the song "Tamashi Kogashite" of the rock band ARB. The reason they put the "Group" in the band name is "Nobody didn't say 'Group' by myself." In 2008 they released a long-awaited new album entitled "Patsun Patsun". It was their longest album to date, at 27 tracks, and featured them covering a new variety of musical genres such as reggae and hip-hop. 2010 marks the group's 15th anniversary, and several releases and events are scheduled in honor of it, including a new album entitled 1!2!3!4!.

Several members of Group Tamashii also have jobs as actors and writers, in addition to their music careers.

Members
Vocal: Hakai "Destroy" (Sadao Abe)
Guitar: Boudou "Riot" (Kankuro Kudo)
Harmonica: Baito Kun "Side Job" (Seminosuke Murasugi)
Vocal: Minato Kaworu (Sarutoki Minagawa)
Bass: Kozono (Ryuichi Kozono)
Drums: Sekken "Soap" (Hiroki Miyake)
Guitar: Chikoku "Late" (Taku Tomizawa)

Discography

Limited Edition Music
 (2006-08-01)

Singles
 (2003-02-05)
 (2005-07-27)
 (I Want to Buy You Some Juice) (2005-10-26) (3rd opening song of Sgt. Frog)
 (2007-06-13)
 (2010-07-21)
 (2010-10-27)
  (2011-02-02) (1st opening song of the anime Beelzebub)

Album

Indie Album
GROOPER (1999-03-25) (This album is mostly comic.)

Major Albums
 (2002-12-25)
 (2004-06-23)
TMC (2005-11-23)
 (Bride and Rock) (2006-12-06)
 (2008-06-18)
1!2!3!4! (2010-11-24)

Other
Group Tamashii no Denki Mamushi no Santora (1999)
Respectable Roosters→Z a-gogo (2005) (The Roosters tribute album)
Matchy Tribute (2006) (Masahiko Kondo tribute album)
Romantist - The Stalin, Michiro Endo Tribute Album (2010) (The Stalin and Michiro Endo tribute album)

DVD
 (2003-12-03)
 (2005-04-27)
 (2006-04-26)
(2007-12-12)
Group Tamashii at The Chichibu Patsun Patsun Festival~ (グループ魂の秩父ぱつんぱつんフェスティバル(雨) Gurūppu Tamashii no Chichibu Patsun Patsun Festival) (2009-02-11)

Publications
 (Tankōbon) (Sony Magazines publication)
 (band-score)

Film
 (1999)

References

External links
Official Japanese site

Japanese rock music groups
Japanese punk rock groups
Ki/oon Music artists
Comedy rock musical groups